Milagros Catalina Collar Nguema (born 15 April 1988) is a Spanish volleyball player, playing as an Opposite hitter (she formerly played as a Middle Blocker). She has been a member of the Spain women's national volleyball team. She is of Equatorial Guinean descent.

References

External links

1988 births
Living people
Spanish women's volleyball players
Sportspeople from Madrid
Spanish sportspeople of Equatoguinean descent
Spanish expatriate sportspeople in Italy
Expatriate volleyball players in Italy
Spanish expatriate sportspeople in France
Expatriate volleyball players in France
Spanish expatriate sportspeople in Romania
Expatriate volleyball players in Romania
Spanish expatriate sportspeople in Turkey
Expatriate volleyball players in Turkey
Spanish expatriate sportspeople in South Korea
Expatriate volleyball players in South Korea
Spanish expatriate sportspeople in the Philippines
Expatriate volleyball players in the Philippines